Popular Song  is an award given by the Library of Congress.

Popular Song may also refer to:
 Popular song
 "Popular Song" (song), by Mika
 "Popular Song",  a section of Façade, Suite No. 2 by William Walton
 Popular Songs, a 2009 album by indie rock band Yo La Tengo
 Inkigayo (Korean for "Popular Song") or The Music Trend, a South Korean music program aired on SBS

See also 
 "The American Popular Song", a song by Neil Diamond composed by Tom Hensley
 Popular (disambiguation)#In_music for songs called "Popular"